Ian Hugh Gordon Ashley (born 26 October 1947 in Wuppertal, Germany) is a British-German racing driver who raced in Formula One for the Token, Williams, BRM and Hesketh teams.

Driving career

Ashley began racing in 1966 when he took a course at the Jim Russell Racing School. He was fast but rather erratic, and soon earned the nickname "Crashley". He reached Formula 5000 in 1972 and was a front-runner in 1973. He made his debut in Formula One in 1974, and briefly drove for the Williams team the following year. His luck got worse over the mid-1970s in Formula One. He was to become a victim of two nasty accidents on circuits that were no longer used by Formula One soon after his two accidents. During 1975, at the German Grand Prix at the Nürburgring where during practice, he crashed severely at the tricky Pflanzgarten section and broke both his ankles, and during practice for the Canadian Grand Prix at Mosport Park in 1977, he went over a bump, flipped his Hesketh, vaulted the barrier and crashed into a television tower. He never raced in Formula One again.

In 1985 he made his CART Championship Car debut at the Miami Grand Prix. He was entered in the 1986 Indianapolis 500 but the car did not appear on track. However, he did make three CART starts in 1986 and finished ninth at the Mid-Ohio Sports Car Course, enough for 28th in the championship. He failed to finish in his other two 1986 starts. He also made a single Indy Lights start at Pocono Raceway and finished sixth.  He made one more CART appearance in 1987, again in Miami but was knocked out by drivetrain trouble.

After Formula One he built a career as a pilot for executive jets in the United States. However, in 1993 he made a return to racing, driving a Vauxhall in the British Touring Car Championship. Following this he briefly raced motorcycle sidecar combinations, before a stint in the TVR Tuscan Challenge one-make series.

In November 2009, he competed in Formula Ford for the first time in over 40 years driving an Elden MK8 in the Walter Hayes Trophy at Silverstone.

Racing record

Complete Formula One results
(key)

Complete British Touring Car Championship results
(key) (Races in bold indicate pole position) (Races in italics indicate fastest lap)

References

1947 births
Living people
English racing drivers
English Formula One drivers
Champ Car drivers
Indy Lights drivers
British Touring Car Championship drivers
Sidecar racers
Token Formula One drivers
Williams Formula One drivers
BRM Formula One drivers
Hesketh Formula One drivers
Barber Pro Series drivers
German emigrants to the United Kingdom